Surat Thermal Power Station is lignite-based thermal power plant. It is located at Nani Naroli village in Surat, Gujarat. The power plant is run by state owned Gujarat Industrial Power Corporation Limited (GIPCL).

Capacity
The installed capacity of the power plant is 500 MW (4x125 MW).

References 

Coal-fired power stations in Gujarat
Surat district
1999 establishments in Gujarat
Energy infrastructure completed in 1999